There were eight special elections to the United States House of Representatives in 1917, during the 64th United States Congress and 65th United States Congress.

List of elections 

|-
! rowspan=2 | 
| rowspan=2 | Samuel J. Tribble
| rowspan=2  | Democratic
| rowspan=2 | 1910
|  | Incumbent died December 8, 1916, after re-election.New member elected January 11, 1917 to finish the current term.Democratic hold.Winner was not a candidate for the next term, see below.
| nowrap | 

|-
|  | Incumbent / member-elect died December 8, 1916, after re-election.New member elected January 11, 1917 to begin the next term.Democratic hold.Winner was not a candidate to finish the previous term, see above.
| nowrap | 

|-
! rowspan=2 | 
| rowspan=2 | David E. Finley
| rowspan=2  | Democratic
| rowspan=2 | 1898
|  | Incumbent died January 26, 1917, after re-election.New member elected February 21, 1917 to finish the current term.Democratic hold.Winner was not a candidate for the next term, see below.
| nowrap | 

|-
|  | Incumbent / member-elect died January 26, 1917, during previous congress after re-election.New member elected February 21, 1917 to begin the next term.Democratic hold.Winner was not a candidate to finish the previous term, see above.
| nowrap | 

|-
! 
| Michael F. Conry
|  | Democratic
| 1908
|  | Incumbent / member-elect died March 2, 1917, during previous congress.New member was elected April 12, 1917.Democratic gain.
| nowrap | 

|-
! 
| Cyrus A. Sulloway
|  | Republican
| 1894
|  | Incumbent died March 11, 1917.New member was elected May 29, 1917.Republican hold.
| nowrap | 

|-
! 
| Daniel W. Comstock
|  | Republican
| 1916
|  | Incumbent died May 19, 1917.New member was elected June 29, 1917.Republican hold.
| nowrap | 

|-
! 
| Henry T. Helgesen
|  | Republican
| 1910
|  | Incumbent died April 10, 1917.New member was elected July 20, 1917.Republican hold.
| nowrap | 

|-
! 
| Orrin D. Bleakley
|  | Republican
| 1916
|  | Incumbent resigned April 3, 1917, after being convicted and fined under the Federal Corrupt Practices Act.New member was elected November 6, 1917.Democratic gain.
| nowrap | 

|-
! 
| Augustus P. Gardner
|  | Republican
| 1902 (Special)
|  | Incumbent resigned May 15, 1917, to join the U.S. Army.New member was elected November 6, 1917.Republican hold.
| nowrap | 

|-
! 
| Ebenezer J. Hill 
|  | Republican
| 1894
|  | Incumbent died September 27, 1917.New member was elected November 6, 1917.Republican hold.
| nowrap | 

|}

See also 
 1916 United States House of Representatives elections

References 

 
1917
United States home front during World War I